Diaeresis (dieresis, diëresis)  may refer to:

 Diaeresis (prosody), pronunciation of vowels in a diphthong separately, or the division made in a line of poetry when the end of a foot coincides with the end of a word
 Diaeresis (linguistics), or hiatus, the separation of adjacent vowels into syllables, not separated by a consonant or pause and not merged into a diphthong
 Diaeresis (diacritic), a diacritic consisting of two side-by-side dots that marks disyllabicity
 Diaeresis (computing), the two-dot diacritic used in unicode

See also
 Two dots (diacritic), the "two side-by-side dots" diacritic, often called a "Diaeresis", despite its having further linguistic uses, such as umlaut and schwa.
 Diairesis, a term in Platonic and Stoic philosophy, the division of a genus into its parts

sv:Trema#Avskiljande funktion: dieresis